Jacques Rousseau (1683, Geneva - 1753, Isfahan) was a Genevan watchmaker. He was sent on a diplomatic mission to Isfahan in Persia (now Iran) by Louis XIV of France in 1708. There he became jeweler to Shah Husayn of Persia at around the same time as his first cousin Isaac Rousseau (father of the writer and philosopher Jean-Jacques Rousseau) was jeweler-clockmaker to the Ottoman Sultan Ahmed III in Constantinople (1705-1711). Jacques died in Isfahan, where his tombstone is in the Christian (Armenian) Cemetery.

He was married to Reine de l’Estoile and his son Jean-François Rousseau and his grandson Jean-Baptiste Rousseau both also became diplomats to Persia and orientalists.

References
 
 
  Florence Hellot-Bellier, France-Iran : quatre cents ans de dialogue, in Studia Iranica, Cahier 34, 2007, Paris.

Ambassadors of France to Safavid Iran
18th-century French diplomats
1683 births
1753 deaths
Clockmakers from the Republic of Geneva
Diplomats from the Republic of Geneva
18th-century people of Safavid Iran